Mesosa is a genus of longhorn beetles of the subfamily Lamiinae, containing the following species:

subgenus Aplocnemia
 Mesosa affinis Breuning, 1936
 Mesosa anancyloides Villiers & Chujo, 1962
 Mesosa andrewsi Gressitt, 1942
 Mesosa angusta Gressitt, 1951
 Mesosa bialbomaculata Breuning, 1968
 Mesosa bifasciata Breuning, 1938
 Mesosa cheni Gressitt, 1951
 Mesosa griseomarmorata Breuning, 1939
 Mesosa kanarensis Breuning, 1948
 Mesosa latifasciata (White, 1858)
 Mesosa longipennis Bates, 1873
 Mesosa mouhoti Breuning, 1970
 Mesosa nebulosa (Fabricius, 1781)
 Mesosa nigrofasciaticollis Breuning, 1968
 Mesosa ornata (Gahan, 1895)
 Mesosa persimilis Breuning, 1936
 Mesosa rosa Karsch, 1882
 Mesosa rupta (Pascoe, 1862)
 Mesosa senilis Bates, 1884
 Mesosa sikkimensis Breuning, 1935
 Mesosa sophiae (Statz, 1938) †
 Mesosa sparsenotata Pic, 1922
 Mesosa subbifasciata Breuning, 1974
 Mesosa subfasciata Gahan, 1895
 Mesosa subrupta Breuning, 1968
 Mesosa subtenuefasciata Breuning, 1968
 Mesosa tenuefasciata Pic, 1926
 Mesosa tonkinea Breuning, 1939
 Mesosa tricolor Breuning, 1955
 Mesosa undata (Fabricius, 1792)

subgenus Mesosa
 Mesosa curculionoides (Linnaeus, 1761)
 Mesosa harmandi Breuning, 1970
 Mesosa mediofasciata Breuning, 1942
 Mesosa myops (Dalman, 1817)
 Mesosa stictica Blanchard, 1871

subgenus Metamesosa
 Mesosa basinodosa Pic, 1925
 Mesosa inaequalipennis Pic, 1944
 Mesosa nomurai Hayashi, 1964
 Mesosa sinica (Gressitt, 1939)

subgenus Perimesosa
 Mesosa atrostigma Gressitt, 1942
 Mesosa bimaculata Breuning, 1936
 Mesosa binigrovittata Breuning, 1942
 Mesosa binigrovittipennis Breuning, 1968
 Mesosa chassoti Breuning, 1970
 Mesosa cribrata Bates, 1884
 Mesosa hirsuta Bates, 1884
 Mesosa irrorata Gressitt, 1939
 Mesosa kirishimana Matsushita, 1943
 Mesosa maculifemorata Gressitt, 1940
 Mesosa medana Breuning, 1954
 Mesosa medioalbofaciata Breuning, 1969
 Mesosa obscuricornis Pic, 1894
 Mesosa pictipes Gressitt, 1937
 Mesosa pieli Pic, 1936
 Mesosa poecila Bates, 1884
 Mesosa seminivea Breuning, 1965
 Mesosa setulosa Breuning, 1938
 Mesosa undulatofasciata Breuning, 1955
 Mesosa yayeyamai Breuning, 1955

subgenus Saimia
 Mesosa albidorsalis (Pascoe, 1865)
 Mesosa albofasciata (Breuning, 1935)
 Mesosa albomarmorata Breuning, 1939
 Mesosa alternata (Breuning, 1936)
 Mesosa amakusae Breuning, 1964
 Mesosa biplagiata (Breuning, 1935)
 Mesosa blairi Breuning, 1935
 Mesosa fruhstorferi Breuning, 1968
 Mesosa griseiventris (Breuning, 1938)
 Mesosa hirticornis (Gressitt, 1936)
 Mesosa incongrua Pascoe, 1885
 Mesosa indica (Breuning, 1935)
 Mesosa innodosa Pic, 1925
 Mesosa kaloensis Breuning, 1938
 Mesosa kuntzeni Matsushita, 1933
 Mesosa lata Breuning, 1956
 Mesosa latefasciatipennis Breuning, 1968
 Mesosa laterialba (Breuning, 1936)
 Mesosa lineata Breuning, 1939
 Mesosa marmorata Breuning & Itzinger, 1943
 Mesosa multinigrosignata Breuning, 1974
 Mesosa niasica (Breuning, 1935)
 Mesosa nigrosignata Breuning, 1939
 Mesosa obscura Gahan, 1895
 Mesosa pardina Heller, 1926
 Mesosa plurinigrosignata Breuning, 1982
 Mesosa pontianakensis Breuning, 1967
 Mesosa postfasciata Breuning, 1974
 Mesosa postmarmorata Breuning, 1965
 Mesosa quadriplagiata (Breuning, 1935)
 Mesosa revoluta (Pascoe, 1865)
 Mesosa rondoni Breuning, 1962
 Mesosa siamensis (Breuning, 1938)
 Mesosa sumatrana (Breuning, 1936)
 Mesosa tonkinensis (Breuning, 1935)
 Mesosa vagemarmorata Breuning, 1961
 Mesosa yunnana (Breuning, 1938)

incertae sedis
 Mesosa expansa (Hong, 1983) †
 Mesosa laxa Zhang, 1989 †
 Mesosa soteria Zhang, 1989 †
 Mesosa varia Zhang, 1989 †

References

 
Mesosini